Osmantəpə is an early Neolithic settlement near Kükü village in the Şahbuz district in the Nakhchivan Autonomous Republic.

Geographical location
The settlement area was discovered after the artefacts on the edge of the river were eroded. The location of the settlement is due to the fact that the area of the settlement is surrounded by several water sources, which the nomadic tribes could use. In order to collect the water from these springs, Shan Giray, the governor of the district, built a dam there as early as 1865, creating the artificial lake.

Previous research on the Neolithic in the South Caucasus
In the South Caucasus region, archaeologists divide the Neolithic into two cultural phases, an early, pre-ceramic Neolithic and a later, ceramic Neolithic. The previous investigations of the Stone Age sites in the region including Azerbaijan showed several periods of the Stone Age from the early Paleolithic to the Neolithic, but the archaeological documentation lacks radiocarbon dates,stratigraphic connections and paleoecological data. In addition, the transition from the Epipalaeolithic cultures of the early Holocene to the Aratashen-Shulaveri-Shomutepe culture (5500-4000 BC) of the late Neolithic and the following Chalcolithic has not been sufficiently investigated. 
In older research, the material and cultural relics of the South Caucasian Neolithic were only represented by the archaeological sites of the Aratashen-Shomutepe-Shulaveri culture and the I Kültəpə culture. The I Kültəpə settlement in Nakhchivan Autonomous Republic, excavated between 1951 and 1964, is considered the oldest archaeological monument of the ceramic Neolithic. C14 measurements showed that the beginning of this settlement dates back to around 6200 BC
In 2015, Yoshihiro Nishiaki, Farhad Guliyev and Seiji Kadowaki published their finds of Haci Elamxanli Tepe (5950-5800 BC) and Göytəpə (5650-5450 BC) and placed between them found a noticeable difference in the composition of the finds: while in the older Haci Elamxanli Tepe there were consistently less than 5% ceramic finds and more than 95% stone artifacts, in Göytəpə the ratio of the oldest to the youngest layer changed from around 10% to 90% more than 75% to less than 25%. According to the archaeologists, this provides evidence that after a century and a half (5800-5650 BC) between the two sites in the find horizons of Göytəpə, the beginning of ceramic production can be read. By comparing their findings with those of neighboring countries, the archaeologists concluded that the Neolithic of the South Caucasus must have developed similarly everywhere. Intensive ceramic production and the trade that may come with it require a developed rural way of life and the associated sedentarism. Recent studies actually show that agriculture and livestock farming developed as forms of economic activity in the ceramic Neolithic of the southern Caucasus. Attempts by other researchers to show a transition between the Mesolithic cultures and the archaeological sites of the ceramic Neolithic, i.e. the gap between 5800 and 5650 BC described above However, were unsuccessful.
The findings in the Osmantəpə settlement published in 2021 help to close this gap

Excavation of the early Neolithic settlement Osmantəpə
The archaeologist in chief, Vali Baxşəliyev, reported on the results of the excavation and investigations, that a total of more than 300 obsidian tools were found in the settlement, including 8 nucleus and 159 microliths. The size of the microliths is on average about 1 to 2 centimeters. The large number of microliths and the nucleus indicated an obsidian  a certain sedentariness of the producers associated with it. The - albeit small amount - ceramics would also speak in favor of a sedentary lifestyle. The analysis of a carbon sample from the upper settlement layer showed, according to Baxşəliyev, that this was in the 6th millennium BC. However, this settlement, unlike Kültepe I, shows that there is a nomadic life.

Obsidian tools and obsidian use
The finds are mainly obsidian products. Obsidian blades predominate among the early tools. Products manufactured later have a greater variety of tools, including so-called sickle teeth (sickle-shaped curved blades). Some of the tools even have multifunctional properties. Such forms are already known from other sites of the Mesolithic and the early Neolithic. According to Baxşəliyev, the results of the investigation of the Osmantəpə settlement could help to clarify how the early Neolithic settlers of Nakhichivans tapped the obsidian deposits. The obsidian tools were mainly made from the Goycha and Zangazur obsidians found in the South Caucasus, which together with the locally operated ceramic production could speak for a closed South Caucasian-Early Neolithic production development.

Economy and settlement method
Veli Bakhshaliyev points out that the tool shapes with short shafts found are not known for the late Neolithic in the South Caucasus. This shows that there was a very early settlement horizon in Osmantəpə. However, the typological determination of the tools showed that the prehistoric people of the place predominantly raised cattle. The sickle teeth and the ceramics would also confirm the agricultural activities of the early Neolithic settlers. The microscopic examinations of the obsidian tools also made it clear that the archaeological site of Osmantəpə was not a temporary storage place for the transport of obsidian. There is evidence that the people lived there for a longer period of time. The extent and structure of a cultural layer uncovered and examined during the excavation would also show that people would have been permanently resident there. Since the settlement was in high mountains and the climate there is very cold in winter, archaeologists assume that the early Neolithic settlement Osmantəpə was only used seasonally. The early Neolithic settlers lived in half-sunken pit houses. Pit houses are still used today by semi-nomadic groups who live in the traditional way on the steppe and from raising cattle.

Classification
According to Baxşəliyev, the discovery of small quantities and small fragments of ceramics shows that the early Neolithic settlement Osmantəpə had only just begun the early ceramic Neolithic in this region. The results of the investigation on the obsidian microliths support this conclusion. According to Baxşəliyev, Osmantəpə's findings confirm the transition from the Mesolithic to the early Neolithic in the South Caucasus.

References

Further reading
 Vali Baxşəliyev: Osmantəpə yaşayış yeri Daş dövrünün yeni abidəsidir. AMEA Naxçıvan Bölməsinin Elmi Əsərləri. In: İctimai və humanitar elmlər seriyası 2021/1 (2021), S. 57–69.
 Vali Baxşəliyev: Cultural-Economic Relationships Of Nakhchivan İn The Neolithic And Early Chalcolithic Period (en). "Ajami", Nakhchivan 2021, S. 225p.

External links 

 Christine Chataigner, Ruben Badalyan und Makoto Arimura: The Neolithic of the Caucasus auf oxfordhandbooks.com, retrieved 30 April 2021.
 ntv Aserbaidschan, Bericht zur Ausgrabung bei Osmantəpə nach Vali Baxşəliyev: Naxçıvanda aşkar olunan yeni Neolit abidəsi xüsusi əhəmiyyəti ilə seçilir - FOTOLAR aus Mədəniyyət və Turizm, 24 February 2021, retrieved 1 May 2021.

Tells (archaeology)
Prehistoric sites in Azerbaijan
Archaeological sites in Azerbaijan
Ancient pottery
Neolithic sites of Asia